The Philadelphia Phillies annual franchise awards have been given since 2004 by the Philadelphia chapter of the Baseball Writers' Association of America to four members of the Philadelphia Phillies franchise for "season-ending achievements."  The awards were created by Bucks County Courier Times Phillies beat writer Randy Miller, who also served as the chairman of the BBWAA's Philadelphia chapter.  Winners receive a glass trophy shaped like home plate. In 2014, a fifth award was added: the Charlie Manuel Award for Service and Passion to Baseball. It was discontinued in 2015.

Winners

See also
Local recipients of Spink Award
J. G. Taylor Spink Award (BBWAA)
Philadelphia Phillies award winners and league leaders#Philadelphia Chapter / BBWAA awards
Baseball awards#Awards given to members of specific teams
Philadelphia Sports Writers Association

References

Major League Baseball team trophies and awards
Annual
Awards established in 2004